Cory V. McCray (born October 31, 1982) is an American politician who serves as a member of the Maryland Senate for Maryland's 45th district, located in northeast Baltimore City. Previously, McCray served as a member of the Maryland House of Delegates and acting Chair of the Maryland Democratic Party.

Early life and career
McCray was born in Baltimore, Maryland and attended Fairmount-Harford High School.

Shortly after McCray's 18th birthday, he signed up for an apprenticeship program with the International Brotherhood of Electrical Workers, where he later served as an organizer. The program gave him enough money to start investigating real estate, purchasing his first house at 20. By age 25, he owned seven houses.

In 2011, McCray received an Associate degree in business management from the Baltimore City Community College and a Bachelor of Arts degree from the National Labor College in 2013. From 2011 to 2013, he served on the Baltimore City Board of Elections.

In 2012, McCray and other community leaders formed the B.E.S.T. Democratic Club, which encouraged young people in east Baltimore to get involved in politics. By 2014, the group had more than 500 members.

In May 2013, McCray announced his candidacy for the Maryland House of Delegates, seeking to succeed delegate Nina R. Harper, who was appointed to the House following the death of Hattie N. Harrison. He prevailed in the Democratic primary, receiving 19.5 percent of the vote and coming third in a field of eight candidates. He received 27.6 percent of the vote in the general election.

McCray is considered a political ally of Brandon Scott. During his 2014 House run, he worked closely with Scott when he was a city councilmember to provide constituent services to residents he encountered while canvassing. McCray was also a member of his mayoral transition team in 2020.

In the legislature
After being sworn in on January 14, 2015, McCray was appointed to the House Environment and Transportation Committee. He is also a member of the Legislative Black Caucus of Maryland and the Baltimore City Delegation.

In March 2017, Nicole Hanson, executive director of Out for Justice, filed an ethics complaint was filed against McCray, saying that she felt "physically and psychologically" threatened by McCray after he lost his temper during a conversation about the roots of poverty, causing him to throw a chair against a wall and begin using expletives. McCray denied throwing a chair, but acknowledged that his language and volume were unacceptable. He did not apologize to Hanson until he ran into her at a community event several weeks later. In April, the General Assembly's ethics committee found that McCray "breached the standards of conduct expected of a member."

In July 2017, McCray publicly expressed interest in challenging Senate President Pro Tempore Nathaniel J. McFadden in the 2018 primary election, saying that he was "about 90 percent sure he will challenge his senator." He announced his candidacy for the Maryland Senate in September. McCray defeated McFadden in the Democratic primary election, receiving 58.5 percent of the vote to McFadden's 41.5 percent. He faced no Republican challengers in the general election.

McCray was sworn into the Maryland Senate on January 9, 2019. He was appointed to the Budget and Taxation Committee, the Joint Audit and Evaluation Committee, the Special Committee on Pensions, the Joint Audit Committee, and the Spending Affordability Committee, and is a member of the Maryland Legislative Transit Caucus, the Legislative Black Caucus of Maryland. He was also an associate member of the Maryland Legislative Latino Caucus from 2019 to 2020. In November 2020, He was elected chair of the Baltimore City Senate Delegation.

In October 2019, following the death of Representative Elijah Cummings, McCray said that he would give "serious consideration" to running in the 2020 special election in Maryland's 7th congressional district to fill the rest of his term. He later said that he would not run for the seat.

Acting Chair of the Maryland Democratic Party

McCray was sworn in as the acting chair of the Maryland Democratic Party on November 11, 2019, following the resignation of Maya Rockeymoore Cummings, who announced her candidacy for the special election in Maryland's 7th congressional district. He opted out of running in the election for the party's new chair. During his short tenure, he alleged that the organization was overspending without strong financial controls under Cummings' leadership. To right the organization's fiscal health, he cancelled contracts with consults and recommended other fiscal controls to the Maryland State Central Committee. On December 7, 2019, the Maryland Democratic Party elected Yvette Lewis to serve as party chairwoman again through December 2022.

Political positions

COVID-19 pandemic
In March 2021, McCray joined five other senators in delivering a letter to Governor Larry Hogan that expressed "grave concerns" over equity of the state's vaccination program rollout.

Crime
McCray was one of four senators to vote against legislation introduced in the 2020 legislative session that would provide tougher penalties for gun offenders.

McCray introduced legislation in the 2022 legislative session that would require the Maryland Division of Pretrial Detention and Services to notify city police whenever someone is released on bail.

Education
McCray introduced legislation during the 2019 legislative session that would expand food stamp benefits through the summer months to students who rely on free meals from their schools. The bill passed and became law without Governor Hogan's signature.

Elections
McCray introduced legislation in the 2015 legislative session that would restore voting rights for ex-offenders. The bill passed, but was vetoed by Governor Hogan; the Maryland General Assembly voted to override the veto on February 9, 2016.

McCray introduced legislation in the 2019 legislative session that would require the Baltimore police to redraw district boundaries after each census. The bill passed and went into effect on October 1, 2019.

In September 2020, McCray sent a letter to Baltimore City elections director Armstead Jones to ask for more dropoff ballot boxes to be placed in his district, saying that his district had fewer boxes compared to others and calling the placement of boxes within Baltimore "unconscionable".

Environment
In September 2019, McCray voted against a climate debate resolution at the Democratic National Committee, arguing that his constituents needed him to advocate for greater movement on issues like justice reform, police brutality, and economic opportunity.

McCray introduced legislation in the 2021 legislative session that would reform the Maryland Environmental Service to restrict future payouts, restructure the board and add new requirements, such as ethics training.

Minimum wage
McCray introduced legislation in the 2019 legislative session that would raise the minimum wage to $15 an hour by 2023. The bill passed with a full-on effective date of 2025, but was vetoed by Governor Larry Hogan on March 27, 2019. The Maryland General Assembly voted to override Hogan's veto on the bill the next day.

Policing
McCray voted in favor of legislation introduced in the 2019 legislative session that would create an armed police force at the private Johns Hopkins University. He also introduced legislation that would require Baltimore police leaders to live in the city.

McCray introduced legislation in the 2019 legislative session that would make the Baltimore Police Department a city agency instead of a state agency. The bill did not receive a vote over reservations from other city senators. He introduced legislation in the 2021 legislative session that would create a commission to study local control of the city police and alllow voters to determine if the city government should regain control of the police department via a charter amendment during the 2022 or 2024 general election. The bill passed and became law.

Taxes
McCray introduced legislation in the 2020 legislative session that would increase the tax on cigarettes and other tobacco products.

Transportation
In 2021, McCray joined local officials in advocating for more funding to meet the Maryland Transit Administration's maintenance and other needs. He introduced legislation in the 2021 legislative session that would increase funding to the Maryland Transit Administration to make the state's bus system, MARC train, Metro and Light Rail more safe and reliable. The bill passed the Maryland General Assembly but was vetoed by Governor Hogan on May 28, 2021. The legislature voted to override Hogan's veto during the 2021 special legislative session.

McCray introduced legislation during the 2022 legislative session that would waive late fees and give Maryland residents the ability to set up payment plans for delayed E-ZPass charges.

Electoral history

References

1982 births
21st-century American politicians
African-American state legislators in Maryland
Living people
Maryland Democratic Party chairs
Democratic Party members of the Maryland House of Delegates
Politicians from Baltimore
Democratic Party Maryland state senators
21st-century African-American politicians
20th-century African-American people